Interpretations is a compilation album by The Carpenters, released in 1994 in Canada/UK & February 1995 in the US in both cassette tape and CD formats. Three of the songs on the album were previously unreleased; "Without a Song", "From This Moment On" and "Tryin' to Get the Feeling Again". The album was released in order to commemorate the 25th anniversary of the duo's debut album Offering. A VHS of the same name was released several months later, featuring footage from the duo's TV performances. It was later issued on DVD.

Track listing
(US Version)
"Without a Song" – 1:02 (Never before released; recorded in 1980 for Music, Music, Music!)
"Superstar" – 3:48 (From the album Carpenters; remixed in 1991)
"Rainy Days and Mondays" – 3:36 (From the album Carpenters; remixed in 1991)
"Bless the Beasts and Children" – 3:15 (From the album A Song for You; remixed in 1985)
"This Masquerade" – 4:53 (From the album Now & Then; remixed in 1990)
"Solitaire" – 4:40 (From the album Horizon)
"When I Fall in Love" – 3:08 (From the album Lovelines; recorded in 1978 for Space Encounters, but used on the subsequent TV special Music, Music, Music!)
"From This Moment On" – 1:57 (Never before released; recorded in 1980 for Music, Music, Music!)
"Tryin' to Get the Feeling Again" – 4:23 (Never before released; recorded in 1975 for Horizon)
"When It's Gone" – 5:01 (From the album Made in America)
"I Believe You" – 3:55 (From the album Made in America)
"Reason to Believe" – 3:04 (From the album Close to You; remixed in 1987)
"(They Long to Be) Close to You" – 3:42 (From the album Close to You; remixed in 1991)
"Calling Occupants of Interplanetary Craft" – 7:08 (From the album Passage; recorded in 1978 for Space Encounters)
"Little Girl Blue" – 3:24 (From the album Lovelines; recorded in 1978 for Space Encounters)
"We've Only Just Begun" – 3:04 (From the album Close to You; remixed in 1985)

Canada/UK listing
"Without a Song"
"Sing"
"Bless the Beasts and Children"
"This Masquerade"
"Solitaire"
"When I Fall in Love"
"From This Moment On"
"Tryin' to Get the Feeling Again"
"When It's Gone"
"Where Do I Go from Here"
"Desperado"
"Superstar"
"Rainy Days and Mondays"
"Ticket to Ride"
"If I Had You"
"Please Mr. Postman"
"We've Only Just Begun"
"Calling Occupants of Interplanetary Craft"
"Little Girl Blue"
"You're the One"
"(They Long to Be) Close to You"

Singles
"Tryin' to Get the Feeling Again"
UK CD single (1994) 580761-2
"Tryin' to Get the Feeling Again"
"Sing"
"(They Long to Be) Close to You"

References

The Carpenters compilation albums
1995 compilation albums